The 1947 Men's World Weightlifting Championships were held in Philadelphia, United States from September 26 to September 27, 1947. There were 39 men in action from 12 nations.

Medal summary

Medal table

References
Results (Sport 123) 
Weightlifting World Championships Seniors Statistics

External links
International Weightlifting Federation

World Weightlifting Championships
World Weightlifting Championships
International weightlifting competitions hosted by the United States
World Weightlifting Championships